In enzymology, a [heparan sulfate]-glucosamine 3-sulfotransferase 3 is an enzyme that catalyzes the chemical reaction

3'-phosphoadenylyl sulfate + [heparan sulfate]-glucosamine  adenosine 3',5'-bisphosphate + [heparan sulfate]-glucosamine 3-sulfate

Thus, the two substrates of this enzyme are 3'-phosphoadenylyl sulfate and heparan sulfate-glucosamine, whereas its two products are adenosine 3',5'-bisphosphate and heparan sulfate-glucosamine 3-sulfate.

This enzyme belongs to the family of transferases, specifically the sulfotransferases, which transfer sulfur-containing groups.  The systematic name of this enzyme class is 3'-phosphoadenylyl-sulfate:[heparan sulfate]-glucosamine 3-sulfotransferase. This enzyme participates in heparan sulfate biosynthesis and glycan structures - biosynthesis 1.

References

 
 
 
 

EC 2.8.2
Enzymes of unknown structure